Govind Muktappa Karjol (b 1951), is an Indian politician who is the current Minister of Major and Medium Irrigation,  water Resources of Karnataka from 4 August 2021.

Personal life 
Govind Karjol was born in karajol bijapur, Karnataka.

Politics 
He is a five-term member of Karnataka Legislative Assembly from Mudhol constituency.  He was also the Deputy Leader of Opposition in Karnataka Legislative Assembly from 25 May 2018 to 26 July 2019, and he was also serving as the  Deputy Leader  of the house in Karnataka Legislative Assembly from 26 August 2019.

He is also a Karnataka State Vice-President of BJP.

He was appointed Minister of State, Public Works Department and Social Welfare in 4th B.S.Yediurappa Ministry.
He is 5th time winner in Mudhol Legislative Assembly Constituency.

Constituency
He represents the Mudhol constituency.

Political Party
He is from the Bharatiya Janata Party.

References 

Karnataka MLAs 2008–2013
Living people
Bharatiya Janata Party politicians from Karnataka
1951 births
Deputy Chief Ministers of Karnataka